Boris Komnenić (29 March 1957 – 6 March 2021) was a Serbian actor. He appeared in more than sixty films from 1980 onwards and a number of theatre roles.

Komnenić died on 6 March 2021 in Belgrade, aged 63.

Selected filmography

References

External links 

1957 births
2021 deaths
People from Pula
Serbian male actors
Serbs of Croatia